The Plumb House is a historic U.S. home located at 1012 West Main Street, Waynesboro, Virginia.  The house currently serves as the Plumb House Museum and is operated by the  Waynesboro Heritage Foundation.

Plumb House Museum
The Plumb House Museum provides information on the Plumb family that lived in the house for five generations and a history of the Battle of Waynesboro, Virginia fought nearby in 1865 during the American Civil War.

References

External links

 Plumb House Museum - Waynesboro Heritage Foundation
Completed National Register of Historic Places Registration Form for the "Plumb House".  This form contains detailed information on the Plumb House.
Picture of “Plumb House” on the Virginia Department of Historic Resources website

American Civil War museums in Virginia
Federal architecture in Virginia
Historic house museums in Virginia
Houses in Waynesboro, Virginia
Houses on the National Register of Historic Places in Virginia
Museums in Waynesboro, Virginia
National Register of Historic Places in Waynesboro, Virginia